|}

This is a list of electoral district results of the 1897 Western Australian election.

Results by Electoral district

Albany

Ashburton

Beverley

Bunbury

Canning

Central Murchison

Coolgardie

De Grey

Dundas

East Coolgardie

East Fremantle

East Kimberley

East Perth

Fremantle

Gascoyne

Geraldton

Greenough

Irwin

Moore

Murchison

Murray

Nelson

North Coolgardie

North Fremantle

North Murchison

North Perth

North-East Coolgardie

Northam

Perth

Pilbara

Plantagenet

Roebourne

South Fremantle

South Murchison

Sussex

Swan

Toodyay

Wellington

West Kimberley

West Perth

Williams

Yalgoo

Yilgarn

York

See also 

 1897 Western Australian colonial election
 Members of the Western Australian Legislative Assembly, 1897–1901

References 

Results of Western Australian elections
1897 elections in Australia
1890s in Western Australia